

Incumbents
 Monarch – Catherine II

Events

 Kościuszko Uprising
 April 4 - Battle of Racławice
 April 17-19 - Warsaw Uprising (1794)
 April 22 - Vilnius Uprising (1794)
 June 6 - Battle of Szczekociny
 June 8 - Battle of Chełm
 July 13 - September 6 - Siege of Warsaw (1794)
 September 19 - Battle of Brest (1794)
 October 10 - Battle of Maciejowice
 November 4 - Battle of Praga

 Kharitonov Palace commissioned
 Korenovsk founded
 Kushchyovskaya founded
 Odessa founded
 Ust-Labinsk founded
 Vilna Governorate-General created

Births
 Abbasgulu Bakikhanov (1794-1847) - Azerbaijani writer, historian, poet, and linguist; Russian military officer
 Pyotr Chaadayev (1794-1856) - philosopher
 Nikolai Borisovich Galitzin (1794-1866) - nobleman who commissioned three string quartets from Beethoven
 Gavriil Antonovich Katakazi (1794-1867) - diplomat and government official
 Nikolay Muravyov-Karsky (1797-1866) - general
 Alexander Petrov (1794-1867) - chess player and writer
 August Georg Wilhelm Pezold (1794-1859) - Estonian painter and lithographer
 Ivan Mikhailovich Simonov (1794-1855) - astronomer and geodesist
 Sergei Grigoryevich Stroganov (1794-1882) - nobleman, statesman, art historian, archaeologist, philanthropist
 Nikolai Sukhozanet (1794-1871) - general and statesman
 Artemy Tereshchenko (1794-1873) - businessman
 Konstantin Thon (1794-1881) - architect
 Alexander Ulybyshev (1794-1858) - diplomat and musicologist, biographer of Mozart
 Ivan Vitali (1794-1855) - sculptor
 Matvei Wielhorski (1794-1866) - Polish-Russian cellist

Deaths
 Gregory Skovoroda (1722-1794) - philosopher, poet, composer
 Ivan Yelagin (1725-1794) - historian, freemason, secretary to Catherine the Great
 Vasily Zuyev (1754-1794) - naturalist and traveler

References

1794 in Russia
Years of the 18th century in the Russian Empire